János Csank (born 27 October 1946, in Ózd, Hungary) is a former goalkeeper and football manager.

Club coaching career

Csank won the National Championship twice, at first in 1994 with Vác FC-Samsung and in 2001 in charge of Ferencváros.

He resigned from Ferencváros in April 2008 after a 2–2 draw against Makó left Fradi in third place eight points behind Nemzeti Bajnokság II (Eastern Group) leaders Kecskeméti TE.

International coaching career

Csank was manager of the Hungarian national football team between April 1996 and November 1997. During this time, Hungary advanced from the World Cup qualification group but suffered a devastating 1–7, 5–0 defeat against FR Yugoslavia.

After the losses against Yugoslavia, Csank resigned from his position and was followed by Bertalan Bicskei.

Personal
Csank is recognizable for his dark humor. At half-time in the losing match against the Yugoslavian team, when a reporter asked him what he's going to say to the players, he replied: "Surely not to keep it up!". At the end of this match, at the interview he said that the major cause of the loss was, "I didn't know that some of my players are so lame."

References

 Ki kicsoda a magyar sportéletben? I. kötet (A–H). Szekszárd, Babits Kiadó, 1994, p. 200., 
FTC Baráti Kör: Interview with Csank 

1946 births
Living people
People from Ózd
Hungarian footballers
Association football goalkeepers
Hungarian football managers
Eger FC managers
Békéscsaba 1912 Előre managers
Dunakanyar-Vác FC managers
Hungarian expatriate football managers
Expatriate football managers in Greece
Hungarian expatriate sportspeople in Greece
Proodeftiki F.C. managers
Hungary national football team managers
Ferencvárosi TC managers
BFC Siófok managers
Fehérvár FC managers
FC Sopron managers
Győri ETO FC managers
Diósgyőri VTK managers
Zalaegerszegi TE managers
Vác FC players
Nemzeti Bajnokság I managers
Sportspeople from Borsod-Abaúj-Zemplén County